Old Tunes is the collective name given to two unofficially released audio cassette tape recordings by the Scottish electronic music duo Boards of Canada: Old Tunes Vol. 1 (also known as A Few Old Tunes), and Old Tunes Vol. 2, both produced in 1996. Although neither tape has been officially released by the band, copies have leaked online and can be found on media-sharing sites such as YouTube.

Background

Old Tunes, as with most of Boards of Canada's other early work, was privately released only to the artists' family and friends. When MP3s of the albums' songs appeared on peer-to-peer file sharing service Soulseek in the early 2000s, there was controversy among fans as to their authenticity given past fraudulent claims of Boards of Canada "rarities" albums. Neither Boards of Canada nor their label acknowledged their validity until someone attempted to sell the tapes on eBay, when a representative for Hexagon Sun explained the private nature of the recordings and the possibility of a compilation release in the future.

Track listings 
on Old Tunes Vol. 1:

Side A:
 "Spectrum" – 2:19
 "Light, Clear Hair" – 0:41
 "P:C:" – 0:48
 "Trapped" – 3:52 (Released on Skam Records as 'Trapped (Hell Interface Remix)' by Colonel Abrams)
 "Rodox Video" – 1:19
 "Happy Cycling" – 1:49 (Not to be confused with the song of the same name on Music Has the Right to Children and the Peel Session EP)
 "House Of Abin'adab" – 1:55
 "Finity" – 5:00
 "Forest Moon" – 6:35
 "Skimming Stones" – 2:12
 "Carcan" – 1:50
 "Devil" – 0:14
 "Mansel" – 5:36
 "She Is P" – 1:42
 "Davie Addison" – 1:15
Side B:
 "Sac" – 1:23
 "Blockbusters" – 0:40
 "I Will Get It Tattooed" – 1:37
 "The Way You Show" – 2:56
 "I Love U" – 1:41 (Later appeared on Music Has the Right to Children as 'The Color of the Fire')
 "King Of Carnival" – 4:18
 "M9" – 3:32
 "Original Nlogax" – 1:11 (Not to be confused with 'Nlogax' on BoC Maxima and Hi Scores)
 "Sequoia" – 4:49
 "Boqurant" – 1:43
 "5.9.78" – 4:14
 "Wendy Miller" – 0:32
 "Paul Russell's Piece" – 0:53
 "Up The March Bank" – 3:24
 "Nova Scotia Robots" – 1:47

on Old Tunes Vol. 2:

Side A:
 "We've Started Up" – 5:39
 "Jimbo Rehearsing" – 0:35
 "Staircase Whip" – 2:14
 "Statue Of Liberty" – 1:52
 "Dave (I'm A Real Traditionalist)" – 1:50
 "Peace-Tony-Devil" – 0:18
 "To The Wind" – 2:30
 "Iraq Says" – 0:38
 "Nine-Rubber Wisdom" – 1:20
 "On A Rolling Sea" – 1:34
 "Iced Cooly Beatnik" – 0:36
 "David Came To Mahana'im" – 4:39
 "Sir Prancelot Brainfire" – 2:51
 "North Sea Arbeit" – 1:12
 "Mushyz" – 0:35
 "Heysanna Hosanna" – 0:59
 "Fly In The Pool" – 0:51
 "Mukinabaht" – 5:05
 "It's A Whole 'Nother Year" – 2:00
Side B:
 "Kiteracer 2" – 2:29
 "Bmx Track" – 5:05
 "Hiscores" – 3:38 (Not to be confused with 'Hi Scores' from the Hi Scores EP.)
 "Geometric Piss" – 0:51
 "Zander Two" – 3:59
 "Magic Teens" – 3:00
 "Apparatus" – 0:33
 "Music For Pylons" – 1:12
 "Alpha Rainbow" – 1:12
 "Northern Plastics" – 1:55
 "Buckie High" – 5:16
 "I Love My New Shears" – 3:11
 "Solarium" – 0:22
 "Breaking Nehushtan" – 2:41
 "Orange Hexagon Sun" – 2:22 
 "Lick" – 2:39
 "Powerline Misfortune" – 1:15

See also 

 Boards of Canada discography

References

External links 
 A Few Old Tunes at Discogs.com
 
 
 

Boards of Canada albums
Ambient albums by Scottish artists
Intelligent dance music albums

bg:A Few Old Tunes